Bissette-Cooley House is a historic home located at Nashville, Nash County, North Carolina.  It was built in 1911, and is a two-story, double pile central hall plan Classical Revival frame dwelling. It has a slate covered, steeply pitched hipped roof topped with a broad deck. It features a full-height pedimented portico overlapping a one-story wraparound porch.  It was the home of Congressman Harold D. Cooley.

It was listed on the National Register of Historic Places in 1985.  It is located in the Nashville Historic District.

References

Houses on the National Register of Historic Places in North Carolina
Neoclassical architecture in North Carolina
Houses completed in 1911
National Register of Historic Places in Nash County, North Carolina
Houses in Nash County, North Carolina
Historic district contributing properties in North Carolina